A Circle Officer (CO) or Sub-divisional police officer (SDPO) is a police officer of the rank of deputy superintendent of police (DSP) or assistant commissioner of police (ACP) heading an independent police sub-division in the various states of India. In some states, the officer of the same rank is designated simply as Deputy superintendent of police (DSP) or in metropolitan cities is designated as Assistant commissioner of police (ACP).

Recruitment 
Recruitment to this rank is made either directly or by promotion. The State Public Service Commissions conduct the State Civil Services Examination periodically to recruit police officers directly to this rank. Another manner of recruitment is by recruiting the officers who have risen through the junior ranks to the rank of the circle officer or deputy superintendent of police or assistant commissioner of police.

Qualifications 
To become a Circle Officer (CO), one must have the following qualifications.(1) The age of the candidate should be at least 21 years and maximum 44 years. (2) The candidate should have a bachelor's degree from a recognized university. (3) The candidate should have passed the Civil Services Examination conducted by the Public Service Commission. (4) Candidate should speak and write the native language of the state.
Police ranks of India
Police ranks
Uttar Pradesh Police